3-Fumarylpyruvic acid, or 3-fumarylpyruvate, is a dicarboxylic acid formed from the isomerisation of 3-maleylpyruvate by maleylpyruvate isomerase. It is converted into fumarate and pyruvate by 3-fumarylpyruvate hydrolase.

References

Dicarboxylic acids